Miss Venezuela 1991 was the 38th Miss Venezuela pageant, was held in Caracas, Venezuela on May 23, 1991, after weeks of events.  The winner of the pageant was Carolina Izsak, Miss Amazonas.

The pageant was broadcast live on Venevision from the Poliedro de Caracas in Caracas. At the conclusion of the final night of competition, outgoing titleholder Andreina Goetz, crowned Carolina Izsak of Amazonas as the new Miss Venezuela.

Results
Miss Venezuela 1991 - Carolina Izsak (Miss Amazonas)
Miss World Venezuela 1991 - Ninibeth Leal (Miss Zulia) 
Miss Venezuela International 1991 - Niurka Acevedo (Miss Monagas)

The runners-up were:
1st runner-up - Connie Hernández (Miss Distrito Federal)
2nd runner-up - Alexandra Virgüez (Miss Península de Paraguaná)
3rd runner-up - Jennifer Díaz (Miss Municipio Vargas)
4th runner-up - Yael Bruzual (Miss Sucre)
5th runner-up - Candice Blanco (Miss Bolívar)
6th runner-up - Beatriz Lesseur (Miss Carabobo)
7th runner-up - Lissette Mutti (Miss Falcón)

Special awards
 Miss Photogenic (voted by press reporters) - Candice Blanco (Miss Bolívar)
 Miss Congeniality - Carolina Motta (Miss Lara)
 Miss Amity - Carolina Motta (Miss Lara)
 Miss Elegance - Alexandra Virgüez (Miss Península de Paraguaná)
 Most Beautiful Eyes - Shia Bertoni (Miss Portuguesa)

Delegates
The Miss Venezuela 1991 delegates are:

Miss Amazonas - Carolina Eva Izsak Kemenyfy
Miss Anzoátegui - Elsie Cristina Mota Guzmán
Miss Apure - Yurby Conti Corro
Miss Aragua - Maria Andreina González Vivas
Miss Barinas - Nayarí Claret Gamboa Hernández
Miss Bolívar - Candice Annette Smith Blanco Peñalver
Miss Canaima - Adriana Maríni Arias
Miss Carabobo - Alix Beatriz Lesseur Cohen
Miss Cojedes -  Isbelia Josefina Quijada Figueroa
Miss Costa Oriental - Mitze Mabel Méndez Borges
Miss Delta Amacuro - Mercedes Argelia Salaya Guzmán
Miss Dependencias Federales - Gabriella Macrina d'Ippólito
Miss Distrito Federal - Connie Daniela Hernández de la Espriella
Miss Falcón - Dora Lissette Mutti Croes 
Miss Guárico - Rossanel Auxiliadora Hernández Quintero
Miss Lara - Carolina Motta Michelena
Miss Mérida - Alba Lucila Vallvé Bethencourt
Miss Miranda - Moravia Cárdenas
Miss Monagas - Niurka Auristela Acevedo
Miss Municipio Libertador - Ainisis Beatriz Vivas Perera
Miss Municipio Vargas - Jennifer Díaz Rodríguez
Miss Nueva Esparta -  Raquel Penelope Benedetti Tovar
Miss Península de Paraguaná - María Alexandra Virgüez Alvarez
Miss Portuguesa - Shia Bertoni Ramos
Miss Sucre - Yael Alexandra Bruzual Muñoz
Miss Táchira - Mariana Martínez de Aparicio Berinez
Miss Trujillo - Ingrid Díaz Arteaga
Miss Yaracuy - Patricia Concepción Laszlou Bastardo
Zulia - Ninibeth Beatriz Leal Jiménez

External links
Miss Venezuela official website

1991 beauty pageants
1991 in Venezuela